Mount Eagle is an unincorporated community and census-designated place in Howard Township, Centre County, Pennsylvania,  United States.  As of the 2010 census, the population was 103.

It is located near the southern corner of Howard Township along Old Route 220, to the southeast of Bald Eagle Creek where it flows into Foster J. Sayers Lake. The long ridge of Bald Eagle Mountain is to the southeast of the town. Old Route 220 dead-ends a short distance to the northeast, where its former route is now inundated by the lake, so the only road access is to the southwest through Boggs Township.

Demographics

References

Census-designated places in Centre County, Pennsylvania
Census-designated places in Pennsylvania